The 1979 NCAA Division I Men's Cross Country Championships were the 41st annual cross country meet to determine the team and individual national champions of NCAA Division I men's collegiate cross country running in the United States. Held on November 19, 1979, the meet was hosted by Lehigh University at the Saucon Valley Fields in Bethlehem, Pennsylvania. The distance for this race was 10 kilometers (6.21 miles).

All Division I cross country teams were eligible to qualify for the meet through their placement at various regional qualifying meets. In total, 29 teams and 237 individual runners contested this championship.

The team national championship was retained by the UTEP Miners, their fifth title. The individual championship was won by Henry Rono, from Washington State, with a time of 28:19.60. This was Rono's third individual title in four years. Along with Gerry Lindgren (1966, 1967, and 1969) and Steve Prefontaine (1970, 1971, and 1973), the former from Washington State and the latter from Oregon, Rono is one of only three Division I collegiate runners with three individual titles.

Men's title
Distance: 10,000 meters (6.21 miles)

Team Result (Top 10)

Individual Result (Top 10)

See also
NCAA Men's Division II Cross Country Championship 
NCAA Men's Division III Cross Country Championship

References
 

NCAA Cross Country Championships
NCAA Division I Cross Country Championships
NCAA Division I Cross Country Championships
NCAA Division I Cross Country Championships
Sports in Bethlehem, Pennsylvania
Track and field in Pennsylvania
Lehigh University